St Mary's Church is a medieval church in the town of Llannerch-y-medd, Anglesey, Wales. St Mary's Church is dedicated to Saint Mary. The east doorway in the tower and other parts of the tower probably date to the 12th century. It was extensively rebuilt in 1850 by the architect Henry Kennedy of Bangor. It was designated a Grade II-listed building on 5 December 1970.

References

External links

12th-century church buildings in Wales
Grade II listed churches in Anglesey